Professor Asaf Savaş Akat (born 3 February 1943) is a Turkish economist and academic. He served as Rector of Istanbul Bilgi University from 1996 to 1998, where he remains a Professor.

Early life and education

In 1954 he attended Levent İlkokulu, Istanbul (primary school). In 1961 he attended Redondo Union H.S., Redondo Beach CA, USA. In 1962 he attended Galatasaray Lisesi, Istanbul (high school). During his time at the high school, he played a saxophone in Kafadarlar band created by Barış Manço. He was educated at Istanbul University (BSc; PhD) and the University of East Anglia (MA, Economics, 1968). He also spent time as a research student at the London School of Economics.

Career

He began his academic career in 1966 at Istanbul University’s Faculty of Economics, where he became a professor in 1980. In 1973 he became associate professor of economics at the same institution. During 1974–75 he was at National Security Academy, Istanbul, Turkey, as a member of teaching staff during military service. In 1980 he became professor of economics at Istanbul University. In 1982 he resigned from the Faculty of Economics of the University of Istanbul.

In 1989 he was lecturer in economics at the Marmara University, Istanbul. In 1993 he was professor of economics at the Faculty of Economics of the University of Istanbul. In 1994 he Founded Academic Board, Istanbul School of International Studies. In 1996 he was Rector of Istanbul Bilgi University. In 1998 he became Professor of Economics, Istanbul Bilgi University.

Personal life

He is married to Prof. Dr. Nilüfer Göle a university professor and an authority on Muslim women’s issues.

Personal views

In one of his November 2011 columns in Vatan, Monetary politics and financial stability (in Turkish), Akat argued that developed countries led by the US used to have a monopoly on economic theories and practises. Akat believes that the global crisis has changed this radically. Developing countries such as Turkey have begun to seize the initiative. “The fatwa of one global financial centre no longer applies,” he wrote. In his interview with ESI, Akat recalls the 1980s and 1990s when Turkey and its economy were not “on anyone’s map.” He talks about the Turkish economy’s “miraculous transformation” in the last decade, about the pro-business and fiscally conservative AKP
government, and the sustainability of the country’s economic growth.

Books and publications

He is the author of many publications and three books on economic issues. His latest, Iktisadi Analiz (Economic Analysis), was
published in 2009. In his paper The Political Economy of Turkish Inflation (2005) he
researched inflation in Turkey in the 1980s and 1990s. Until 2009 Akat was one of the faces of
Ekodiyalog, a popular television program on economics.

References

1943 births
Istanbul University alumni
Alumni of the University of East Anglia
Academic staff of Istanbul University
Academic staff of Istanbul Bilgi University
Turkish economists
People from Ankara
Living people